Uzhivka is a village in Novoazovsk Raion (district) in Donetsk Oblast of eastern Ukraine at 122.2 km SSE from the centre of Donetsk city, at 22.6 km WNW from Novoazovsk.

The settlement was taken under control of pro-Russian forces during the War in Donbass, that started in mid-April 2014.

Demographics
In 2001 the settlement had 136 inhabitants. Native language distribution as of the Ukrainian Census of 2001:
Ukrainian: 54.56%
Russian: 14.71%

References

Villages in Kalmiuske Raion